ENSA – Seguros de Angola S.A. is the main insurance company in Angola.

History 
ENSA was created in 1978 as Empresa Nacional de Seguros e Resseguros de Angola as (U.E.E.; Unidade Economica Estatal), and was later converted into a joint-stock company.

In May 2013, the Standard Chartered bank entered a 60/40 partnership with the ENSA to develop its activities in Angola. In August 2019, the Angolan government announced the privatization of approximately 195 state companies, including the ENSA, a move that had already been announced in 2013.

Structure 
The firm employs 700 people. ENSA works through 30 branch offices of its own, and sells its services at 54 post offices and one bank.

ENSA manages two companies:

 ENSA S.A., an insurance company
 ENSA RE SA, a reinsurance company

ENSA claims to hold more than 50% of the Angolan insurance market. In December 2018, ENSA held 38% of the insurance market shares in Angola.

References

External links
ENSA website

Insurance companies of Angola
Financial services companies established in 1978
Angolan brands
1978 establishments in Angola